Terry Lamar England (born August 10, 1966) is an American politician from Georgia. England is a Republican member of the Georgia House of Representatives from the 116th District, serving since 2013. England represented the 108th district from 2005 to 2013. He has sponsored 411 bills.

References

External links 
 Terry England at ourcampaigns.com

Living people
1966 births
Republican Party members of the Georgia House of Representatives
21st-century American politicians